Daymi de La Caridad Ramirez Echevarria (born 8 October 1983) is a Cuban volleyball player who competed in the 2004 and 2008 Summer Olympics.

In 2004, she was a member of the Cuban team which won the bronze medal in the Olympic tournament.

Four years later she finished fourth with the Cuban team in the 2008 Olympic tournament.

She was born in Havana.

Awards

Individuals
 2008 Montreux Volley Masters "Best Spiker"
 2008 World Grand Prix "Best Spiker"

Clubs
 2013-14 Azerbaijan Super League –  Runner-Up, with Igtisadchi Baku
 2017 South American Club Championship -  Runner-up, with Praia Clube

References
 

1983 births
Living people
Cuban women's volleyball players
Volleyball players at the 2004 Summer Olympics
Volleyball players at the 2008 Summer Olympics
Olympic volleyball players of Cuba
Olympic bronze medalists for Cuba
Olympic medalists in volleyball
Volleyball players at the 2003 Pan American Games
Pan American Games silver medalists for Cuba
Medalists at the 2004 Summer Olympics
Pan American Games gold medalists for Cuba
Pan American Games medalists in volleyball
Outside hitters
Opposite hitters
Setters (volleyball)
Medalists at the 2003 Pan American Games
21st-century Cuban women